Javier Molina Casillas (born January 2, 1990) is an American professional boxer. As an amateur, he won the 2007 U.S. National Championships at the age of 17 and represented the United States the following year at the 2008 Beijing Olympics.

Personal life
Molina's father, Miguel, had a successful amateur boxing career in Ciudad Juárez, Mexico, before he migrated to the United States. His older brother Carlos is a highly regarded prospect with a 17-1-1 record, and his twin brother, Oscar Molina, fights on the Mexican Olympic team.

Amateur career
With a Vicente Fernández ring entrance song of "No Me Se Rajar", a tune that reflects the macho culture that prevails in Mexico, Molina finished his amateur career with a record of 111-12. He won a bronze medal at the 2006 Cadet World Championships at lightweight and a national title at the 2006 Junior Olympic International Invitational. He knocked down Karl Dargan (a two-time 141-pound U.S. champion and winner of the 2007 Pan American Games) twice at the U.S. championships. He then won against Jeremy Bryan and Dan O'Connor, followed by Brad Solomon in the finals, to win the junior welterweight title. At the World Championships in 2007, he beat Azerbaijan's Emil Maharramov, the 2005 bronze medalist, 27-10, but lost to England's 2008 Olympian Bradley Saunders.

2008 Olympics
At the Olympic qualifier, Molina beat Myke Carvalho and then sealed his qualification with a win over Canada's Kevin Bizier. He lost his Olympic debut 1:14 to Boris Georgiev of Bulgaria. According to at least one doctor, it was a fight that never should have taken place. After it was over, Coach Dan Campbell said Molina had gone into the bout with a small hole in his lung, which allowed air to seep out beneath the skin.

Professional career
Molina is signed to the promotional company Goossen Tutor. In his third fight, he got a second round K.O. over veteran Miguel Garcia.

Professional boxing record

|- style="margin:0.5em auto; font-size:95%;"
|align="center" colspan=8|22 Wins (9 knockouts), 4 Losses, 0 Draw
|- style="margin:0.5em auto; font-size:95%;"
|align=center style="border-style: none none solid solid; background: #e3e3e3"|Res.
|align=center style="border-style: none none solid solid; background: #e3e3e3"|Record
|align=center style="border-style: none none solid solid; background: #e3e3e3"|Opponent
|align=center style="border-style: none none solid solid; background: #e3e3e3"|Type
|align=center style="border-style: none none solid solid; background: #e3e3e3"|Rd., Time
|align=center style="border-style: none none solid solid; background: #e3e3e3"|Date
|align=center style="border-style: none none solid solid; background: #e3e3e3"|Location
|align=center style="border-style: none none solid solid; background: #e3e3e3"|Notes
|-align=center
|Loss || 22-4-0 ||align=left| Jesus Alejandro Ramos
|UD || 10 || May 1, 2021 ||align=left| Dignity Health Sports Park, Carson
|align=left|
|-align=center
|Loss || 22-3-0 ||align=left| José Pedraza
|UD || 10 || September 19, 2020 ||align=left| The Bubble, Las Vegas
|align=left|
|-align=center
|Win || 22-2-0 ||align=left| Amir Imam
|UD || 8 || February 22, 2020 ||align=left| MGM Grand Garden Arena, Paradise
|align=left|
|-align=center
|-align=center
|Win || 21-2-0 ||align=left| Hiroki Okada
|KO || 1 (10) || November 2, 2019 ||align=left| Dignity Health Sports Park, Carson
|align=left|
|-align=center
|-align=center
|Win || 20-2-0 ||align=left| Manuel Mendez
|UD || 8 || August 17, 2019 ||align=left| Banc of California Stadium, Los Angeles
|align=left|
|-align=center
|-align=center
|Win || 19-2-0 ||align=left| Abdiel Ramírez
|UD || 8 || March 23, 2019 ||align=left| The
Hangar, Costa Mesa
|align=left|
|-align=center
|-align=center
|Win || 18-2-0 ||align=left| Jessie Roman
|UD || 8 || June 1, 2018 ||align=left| Belasco Theater, Los Angeles
|align=left|
|-align=center
|-align=center
|Loss || 17-2-0 ||align=left| Jamal James
|UD || 10 (10) || January 19, 2016 ||align=left| Club Nokia, Los Angeles
|align=left|
|-align=center
|-align=center
|Win || 17-1-0 ||align=left| Lenwood Dozier
|RTD || 7 (10) || October 13, 2015 ||align=left| Little Creek Casino Resort, Shelton
|align=left|
|-align=center
|-align=center
|Win || 16-1-0 ||align=left| Luis Prieto
|SD || 6 (6) || November 1, 2014 ||align=left| Arena Coliseo, Mexico City
|align=left|
|-align=center
|-align=center
|Win || 15-1-0 ||align=left| Jorge Pimentel
|KO || 3 (8) || September 6, 2014 ||align=left| Gimnasio Miguel Hidalgo, Puebla
|align=left|
|-align=center
|-align=center
|Win || 14-1-0 ||align=left| Francisco Javier Parra
|KO || 1 (6) || June 8, 2013 ||align=left| Villa Charra, Tijuana
|align=left|
|-align=center
|-align=center
|Win || 13-1-0 ||align=left| Joseph Elegele
|UD || 8 (8) || March 9, 2013 ||align=left| The Hangar, Costa Mesa
|align=left|
|-align=center
|-align=center
|Win || 12-1-0 ||align=left| Fernando Silva
|MD || 6 (6) || November 24, 2012 ||align=left|Gimnasio Municipal "Jose Neri Santos", Ciudad Juárez
|align=left|
|-align=center
|-align=center
|Win || 11-1-0 ||align=left| Octavio Narvaez
|TKO || 3 (6) || June 22, 2012 ||align=left| Soboba Casino, San Jacinto
|align=left|
|-align=center
|-align=center
|Win || 10-1-0 ||align=left| Alberto Herrera
|UD || 6 (6) || January 20, 2012 ||align=left| Pearl Theater, Paradise
|align=left|
|-align=center
|-align=center
|Loss || 9-1-0 ||align=left| Artemio Reyes
|UD || 8 (8) || October 28, 2011 ||align=left| Bally's Event Center, Atlantic City
|align=left|
|-align=center
|-align=center
|Win || 9-0-0 ||align=left| John Revish
|UD || 6 (6) || September 15, 2011 ||align=left| County Coliseum, El Paso
|align=left|
|-align=center
|-align=center
|Win || 8-0-0 ||align=left| Hector Alatorre
|UD || 6 (6) || June 24, 2011 ||align=left| Pechanga Resort and Casino, Temecula
|align=left|
|-align=center
|-align=center
|Win || 7-0-0 ||align=left| David Lopez
|UD || 6 (6) || May 27, 2011 ||align=left|Reno Events Center, Reno
|align=left|
|-align=center
|Win || 6-0-0 ||align=left| Danny Diaz
|UD || 4 (4) || May 14, 2011 ||align=left| Home Depot Center, Carson
|align=left|
|-align=center
|Win || 5-0-0 ||align=left| Francisco Ríos
|UD || 4 (4) || November 27, 2010 ||align=left|Oracle Arena, Oakland
|align=left|
|-align=center
|Win || 4-0-0 ||align=left| Antonio Arauz
|TKO || 1 (0:39) || October 7, 2010 ||align=left| Tachi Palace Hotel & Casino, Lemoore
|align=left|
|-align=center
|Win || 3-0-0 ||align=left| Miguel Garcia 
|TKO || 2 (2:42) || November 27, 2009 ||align=left|Pechanga Resort and Casino, Temecula
|align=left|
|-align=center
|Win || 2-0-0 || align=left| Gerald Valdez
|TKO || 2 (2:39) || April 23, 2009 ||align=left| Tachi Palace Hotel & Casino, Lemoore
|align=left|
|-align=center
|Win || 1-0-0 || align=left| Jaime Cabrera
|TKO || 2 (1:50) || March 27, 2009 ||align=left| Nokia Theater, Los Angeles
|align=left|Pro Debut
|-align=center

References

External links
Javier Molina's Amateur Record

American boxers of Mexican descent
Boxers at the 2008 Summer Olympics
Living people
1990 births
Winners of the United States Championship for amateur boxers
Olympic boxers of the United States
Mexican emigrants to the United States
American twins
Twin sportspeople
American male boxers
People from Commerce, California
Welterweight boxers